Allium yuanum is a plant species endemic to the Sichuan region in southern China.

Allium yuanum has a cluster of narrow bulbs usually no more than 4 mm across. Scape is up to 60 cm tall, round in cross-section. Leaves about 3 mm wide, about the same length as the scape. Flowers are blue.

References

yuanum
Onions
Flora of China
Flora of Sichuan
Plants described in 1937